Maud Frances Eyston Sumner (1902–1985) was a South African artist.

Sumner was born in Johannesburg, Transvaal Colony. After completing her schooling at Roedean in Johannesburg, she studied literature at Oxford University from 1922 to 1925 and then studied painting at the Westminster School of Art. Attracted to the French art scene, she moved to Paris in 1926, where she studied for four years at the Academie de la Grande Chaumière. She was part of the art movement called the Ateliers d'Art Sacré and loved the new style of painting taught by the masters George Desvallieres and his co-founder Maurice Denis, where everyday scenes were permeated with religious undertones. She was a designer for the stained glass manufacturer Goddard & Gibbs.

Although she had been separated from the South African art world, Sumner was invited by Walter Battiss to exhibit with the New Group in 1938.

She was awarded the Medal of Honour by the Suid-Afrikaanse Akademie vir Wetenskap en Kuns in November 1971, accompanied by a sensationally successful "semi-retrospective" exhibition at the South African Association of Art Gallery in Pretoria.

During her stay in Paris in 1978, Sumner was diagnosed with Guillain–Barré syndrome. She died in early January 1985 at her home in Melrose, Johannesburg.

References

External links 
Biography at Johan S Borman

1902 births
1985 deaths
20th-century South African women artists
People from Johannesburg
Alumni of the University of Oxford
Alumni of Roedean School, South Africa
Alumni of the Westminster School of Art
Alumni of the Académie de la Grande Chaumière
People with Guillain–Barré syndrome